Ruellia  asperula (syn. Stephanophysum asperulum Mart. & Nees) is a medicinal plant native to Brazil and growing in Caatinga vegetation and Cerrado vegetation. Flowers, leaves, and roots of this plant are usually macerated and used to treat asthma, bronchitis, fever, flu, and uteral inflammation.

External links
Floral Traits and Pollination Systems in the Caatinga, a Brazilian Tropical Dry Forest by Isabel Cristina Machado and Ariadna Valentina Lopes
Ruellia  asperula
  Ruellia  asperula

asperula
Endemic flora of Brazil
Flora of the Cerrado